Treen may refer to:

Treen (object), articles made of wood
Treen, St Levan, a village on the south coast of the Penwith peninsula in Cornwall, England
Treen, Zennor, a hamlet near the north coast of the Penwith peninsula in Cornwall, England
Treen Cove, a tidal beach near the hamlet 
Treen, at one time an administrative unit in the Isle of Man
Treen Cliff, a Site of Special Scientific Interest (SSSI)  on the Penwith Peninsula in Cornwall, England
Treens, fictional aliens in the "Dan Dare" space stories

People
Treen Morris (born 1944), Irish sailor
Dave Treen (1980–1984), governor of the U.S. state of Louisiana
Joyce Treen, Canadian politician
Mary Treen (1907–1989), American actress

See also 
Treene (disambiguation)